The superior rectus muscle is a muscle in the orbit. It is one of the extraocular muscles. It is innervated by the superior division of the oculomotor nerve (III). In the primary position (looking straight ahead), its primary function is elevation, although it also contributes to intorsion and adduction. It is associated with a number of medical conditions, and may be weak, paralysed, overreactive, or even congenitally absent in some people.

Structure 
The superior rectus muscle originates from the annulus of Zinn. It inserts into the anterosuperior surface of the eye. This insertion has a width of around 11 mm. It is around 8 mm from the corneal limbus.

Nerve supply 
The superior rectus muscle is supplied by the superior division of the ipsilateral oculomotor nerve (III). Each superior rectus muscle is innervated by contralateral oculomotor nucleus in the mesencephalon.

Relations 
The superior rectus muscle is related to the other extraocular muscles, particularly to the medial rectus muscle and the lateral rectus muscle. The insertion of the superior rectus muscle is around 7.5 mm from the insertion of the medial rectus muscle, around 7.1 mm from the insertion of the lateral rectus muscle, and around 7.9 from the corneal limbus. There is an intermuscular septum between it and the lateral rectus muscle.

Variation 
Variations of the superior rectus muscle is rare. It may rarely have two muscle bellies parallel to each other. More rarely, it may be congenitally absent.

Function 

The superior rectus muscle elevates, adducts, and helps intort (rotate medially) the eye.

Clinical significance

Testing 
The superior rectus muscle is the only muscle that is capable of elevating the eye when it is in a fully abducted position.

Exophthalmos 
Much of the venous drainage of the orbit and the extraocular muscles passes close to the superior rectus muscle. Obstruction to this venous drainage can cause venous congestion in the eye, which may cause exophthalmos (bulging eye ball). This may be shown with CT scans.

Weakness and paralysis 
The superior rectus muscle may be weakened or paralysed by problems with nerve conduction of the oculomotor nerve (III). This may be congenital, often with a familial genetic link, or acquired, most often caused by head injuries.

Overreaction 
Local anaesthetics used in cataract surgery may weaken the inferior rectus muscle, despite efforts to use minimal anaesthetic and to avoid placing the needle into the muscle. Weakness of the inferior rectus muscle may strengthen the superior rectus muscle, causing it to be overreactive. This may elevate the eye, and prevent its use in normal vision. Treatment may involve eye surgery that weakens or repositions the superior rectus muscle, which generally has good outcomes.

Absence 
Very rarely, the superior rectus muscle may be congenitally absent. This may be caused by Apert syndrome. This causes a reduced ability to elevate the eye. It may be treated with eye surgery that uses parts of the medial rectus muscle and the lateral rectus muscle to restore the functions normally performed by the superior rectus muscle.

Additional images

References

External links 
 
 

Muscles of the head and neck
Human eye anatomy

de:Augenmuskeln#Musculus rectus superior